Eberdingen is a municipality in the district of Ludwigsburg in Baden-Württemberg, Germany.

History
The municipality of Eberdingen was created in 1975 by the merging of the municipalities of Eberdingen, Hochdorf an der Enz, and Nussdorf.

Geography
The municipality (Gemeinde) of Eberdingen is located at the western extremity of the district of Ludwigsburg, in the German state of Baden-Württemberg, along its border with the districts of Böblingen and the Enz. Eberdingen is physically located in  the Neckar. Elevation above sea level in the municipal area ranges from a high of  Normalnull (NN) to a low of  NN.

Politics
Eberdingen has three boroughs (Ortsteile) – Eberdingen, Hochdorf, and Nussdorf – and four villages: Amphertal, Schillerhöhe, Sonnenberg, Sorgenmühle. The abandoned village of Hohenscheid is also located in the municipal area.

Coat of arms
Eberdingen's coat of arms displays three red roses with five green sepals growing out of a green, three-pointed hill upon a field of yellow. This coat of arms was derived from a 16th century court seal and selected specifically to represent the three municipalities that formed Eberdingen. It was approved and a corresponding municipal flag issued by the Luwdigsburg district office on 10 May 1977.

Transportation
Eberdingen is connected to Germany's network of roadways by its local Landesstraßen and Kreisstraßen. Local public transportation is provided by the Verkehrs- und Tarifverbund Stuttgart.

References

External links

  (in German)

Ludwigsburg (district)
Württemberg